Qaleh-ye Now-e Mozaffari (also Romanized as Qal‘eh-ye Now-e Moz̧affarī; also known as Qalehnū-e Moz̧afarī) is a village in Kavar Rural District, in the Central District of Kavar County, Fars Province, Iran. At the 2006 census, its population was 155, in 37 families.

References 

Populated places in Kavar County